Prodromos Korkizoglou (born 27 February 1975 in Larissa, Thessaly) is Greece's most prominent decathlete and competes for the Pelasgos Sports Club.

He is the current holder of the national decathlon record (8069 points) and his highest distinction was the gold medal at the 2001 Mediterranean Games. He sustained an ankle injury in 2004, which failed to heal completely by the 2004 Olympics.  He has not been able to compete since.

Achievements

External links

1975 births
Living people
Athletes from Larissa
Greek decathletes
Athletes (track and field) at the 2000 Summer Olympics
Athletes (track and field) at the 2004 Summer Olympics
Olympic athletes of Greece
Mediterranean Games gold medalists for Greece
Mediterranean Games bronze medalists for Greece
Mediterranean Games medalists in athletics
Athletes (track and field) at the 1997 Mediterranean Games
Athletes (track and field) at the 2001 Mediterranean Games
20th-century Greek people